Farrad (born Willie Farrad Mullins; in Norwalk, Connecticut) is a New York City-Based, American recording artist. He began performing in New York City's downtown performance scene with the experimental performance ensemble Big Art Group directed by Caden Manson and Jemma Nelson. He has also danced with the performance group, The Dazzle Dancers and performed under the moniker Negro Noir.

The Time Is Now, 2009-2011
Farrad first previewed tracks off his debut album, The Time Is Now, at Joe's Pub on New Year's 2009. In March he started his own record label, Beulah's Baby Entertainment, (named for his mother) with business partner, Gabe Goldberg.  The Time Is Now was produced in collaboration with NYC producer, JSpark and released on June 8, 2009. Reviewed by Walt Cessna in BlackBook, the album is described as "funky dance, bluesy rock, and urban pop." He had his album release event Santos Party House in NYC on July 8, 2009.  In September 2009 he performed at New York City Fashion Week as the featured performer at the Hauteholics Anonymous, "Haute Off The Press" event sponsored by Mark. Cosmetics.

The Time Is Now was licensed by Bunim/Murray Productions for shows including: MTV’s Real World, Road Rules, Extreme Challenge & The Stylist; E!’s Keeping Up with the Kardashians & Kourtney and Khloé Take Miami; and Bad Girls Club on Oxygen.

Pick Your Face Up Off The Floor
Farrad's second project, the 13-track remix album for his first single "Pick Your Face Up Off The Floor" was officially released on iTunes on December 15, 2009.  He collaborated with DJs including The Sharp Boys, Twisted Dee, JJ Appleton and Ron Kurti and the song was a Billboard Breakout for Hot Dance Club Play in January, 2010.  Picked as the song of the day on About.com, the single was described as a "strong introductory mantra."

The single's video debuted on Logo network’s PopLab on April 6, 2010.  His video was directed by Greg Haggart and produced by Ann Gilbertson (producer of music videos and concert footage for acts such as Rolling Stones, Michael & Janet Jackson, David Bowie and Nine Inch Nails). Designer SoHung Tong created custom costumes, and world record-breaking motor cross racer, Shane San Miguel, starred as the daredevil nemesis for the song that's described as "chock full of delicious hooks" by Michael Shulman (writer) of ShulmanSays.com.

Farrad also starred in artist, David Raleigh’s music video for the single "I Do" produced by singer/songwriter Nathan Leigh Jones and mixed by New York producer J Chris Griffin. The music video for "I Do!" was directed by Alan Cumming and Ned Stresen-Reuter, and made its broadcast premiere on Logo on February 2, 2010.[3]

Farrad lent vocal talent to NYC artists, Apokalipps, first EP "Change Positions", released January 29, 2009.

Farrad is inspired by artists Stevie Wonder, Tina Turner, Mick Jagger and pop stars Prince & Michael Jackson.

Discography 

 The Time Is Now (2009)
 Pick Your Face Up Off the Floor: The Remixes (2009)
 Misunderstood EP (2010)
 The Way You Do EP (2011)

References

External links
 http://www.thehour.com/story/473368/" 'The Time is Now' for Farrad
 https://web.archive.org/web/20110109025810/http://farrad.com/music/
 http://dancemusic.about.com/b/2010/02/23/song-of-the-day-farrad-pick-your-face-up-off-the-floor.htm
 http://www.shulmansays.com/?id=199

Living people
1976 births
Musicians from Norwalk, Connecticut
Singers from New York City
21st-century American singers
21st-century American male singers